Chthamalia is a genus of flowering plants in the dogbane family (Apocynaceae: Gonolobinae). The genus was first formally named in 1844. It contains approximately 15 species. Chthamalia is considered by some to be a synonym or a subgenus of Matelea.

References

Apocynaceae
Apocynaceae genera